Kettering Health Main Campus, formerly known as Kettering Medical Center (KMC), is a faith-based, nonprofit hospital located in Kettering, Ohio, United States. Founded in 1964, it is the flagship hospital of the Kettering Health, and is directly affiliated with the Seventh-day Adventist Church. It is also affiliated with the Boonshoft School of Medicine. In 2020, Forbes and Great Places to Work named Kettering Health a "Best Place to Work", regardless of industry.

History
Virginia Kettering and her husband Eugene, son of famous inventor Charles F. Kettering, were native citizens of Dayton. They moved to Hinsdale, Illinois near Chicago in the 1940s. During the polio epidemic in the 1950s, they were inspired by the care given at Hinsdale Hospital, which would play a vital role in the foundation of Kettering Medical Center. Following the death of his father in 1958, the younger Ketterings moved from Illinois back to Dayton to help manage family affairs. Health care was a primary focus of Charles Kettering, so Eugene and Virginia led efforts to open a local area hospital in his honor. Ground was broken on July 7, 1961. In 1964, Charles F. Kettering Memorial Hospital opened under the leadership of the Seventh-day Adventist Church.

In October 2010 Kettering Medical Center opened the Benjamin and Marian Schuster Heart Hospital, a new wing to the hospital that included a renovated lobby and new main entrance with an outpatient pharmacy, expanded gift shop and bakery.

In 2016, Kettering Health opened the new pavilion that houses the Kettering Health Cancer Center, and Kettering Health Brain & Spine. The $60 million structure is connected to the main hospital via a skybridge over Southern Boulevard.

See also

 List of Seventh-day Adventist hospitals
 List of Seventh-day Adventist medical schools
 List of hospitals in Ohio

References

External links 
 
 Kettering Health

Hospital buildings completed in 1964
Buildings and structures in Montgomery County, Ohio
Teaching hospitals in Ohio
Kettering, Ohio
Hospitals in Ohio
Kettering Health Network
Trauma centers